5041 Theotes  is a mid-sized Jupiter trojan from the Greek camp, approximately  in diameter. It was discovered on 19 September 1973, by Dutch astronomer couple Ingrid and Cornelis van Houten at Leiden, on photographic plates taken by Dutch–American astronomer Tom Gehrels at the Palomar Observatory, California. The dark Jovian asteroid belongs to the 120 largest Jupiter trojans and has a short rotation period of 6.5 hours.

Orbit and classification 

Theotes is a dark Jovian asteroid orbiting in the leading Greek camp at Jupiter's  Lagrangian point, 60° ahead of the Gas Giant's orbit in a 1:1 resonance . It is also a non-family asteroid in the Jovian background population.

It orbits the Sun at a distance of 5.0–5.4 AU once every 11 years and 10 months (4,311 days; semi-major axis of 5.18 AU). Its orbit has an eccentricity of 0.04 and an inclination of 11° with respect to the ecliptic. The body's observation arc begins with its first observation, a precovery taken a Palomar in December 1953.

Palomar–Leiden Trojan survey 

While the discovery date aligns with the second Palomar–Leiden Trojan survey, Theotes has not received a  prefixed survey designation, which was assigned to the discoveries made by the fruitful collaboration between the Palomar and Leiden observatories in the 1960s and 1970s. Gehrels used Palomar's Samuel Oschin telescope (also known as the 48-inch Schmidt Telescope), and shipped the photographic plates to Ingrid and Cornelis van Houten at Leiden Observatory where astrometry was carried out. The trio are credited with the discovery of several thousand asteroids.

Naming 
This minor planet was named 'Theotes' after the herald of Menestheus in Homer's Iliad. The naming citation was published by the Minor Planet Center on 16 May 1992.

Menustheus' herald is actually Thootes. The 'e' of 'Theotes' follows a misspelling in a German translation of the Iliad that was retained in subsequent Swedish and Dutch translations.

Physical characteristics 

Theotes is an assumed C-type asteroid, while the most prominent spectral type in the Jovian asteroid population is that of a D-type.

Rotation period 

In March 2013, a rotational lightcurve of Theotes was obtained from four nights of photometric observations by Daniel Coley at the Center for Solar System Studies in Landers, California. Lightcurve analysis gave a rotation period of  hours with a brightness amplitude of 0.35 magnitude.

Diameter and albedo 

According to the survey carried out by the NEOWISE mission of NASA's Wide-field Infrared Survey Explorer, Theotes measures 41.90 kilometers in diameter and its surface has an albedo of 0.058, while the Collaborative Asteroid Lightcurve Link assumes a standard albedo for a C-type asteroid of 0.057 and calculates a diameter of 40.33 kilometers based on an absolute magnitude of 10.7.

Notes

References

External links 
 Asteroid Lightcurve Database (LCDB), query form (info )
 Dictionary of Minor Planet Names, Google books
 Discovery Circumstances: Numbered Minor Planets (5001)-(10000) – Minor Planet Center
 Asteroid 5041 Theotes at the Small Bodies Data Ferret
 
 

005041
Discoveries by Cornelis Johannes van Houten
Discoveries by Ingrid van Houten-Groeneveld
Discoveries by Tom Gehrels
Named minor planets
19730919